Steve Azzi is a Lebanese international rugby league footballer who has played as a second row for the Canterbury Bulldogs in the NSW Cup.

Azzi is a Lebanese international.

References

External links
NRL profile

Living people
Rugby league second-rows
Lebanese rugby league players
Lebanon national rugby league team players
Australian rugby league players
Rugby league players from New South Wales
Year of birth missing (living people)